"No More Tears (Enough Is Enough)" is a 1979 song recorded by American singers Barbra Streisand and Donna Summer. It was written by Paul Jabara and Bruce Roberts, and produced by Giorgio Moroder and Gary Klein.

The song was recorded for Streisand's Wet album and also as a new track for Summer's compilation double album On the Radio: Greatest Hits Volumes I & II. The full-length version was found on Streisand's album, while a longer 11-minute edit (the 12" version) was featured on Summer's album. The longer 12" version features additional production by frequent collaborator Harold Faltermeyer, and incorporates a harder rock edge. The single was released on both Casablanca Records (Summer's label) and Columbia Records (Streisand's label) and sales of the two were amalgamated. The versions on the two 7" singles differed slightly however, with different mixes and slightly different background vocal arrangements. The formats differed between nations—in the UK for example, the song was only released on 7" by Casablanca, and 12" (the extended version from the On The Radio album) by Columbia.
 
Although the sales of the two labels' releases were amalgamated, both the 7" and the 12" were certified Gold by the RIAA in early 1980. The 7" single was eventually certified Platinum, signifying sales of two million US copies.

Bowing on the Hot 100 at number 59 on 20 October 1979, the single went to number one on the Billboard Hot 100 on 24 November – 1 December 1979 (making it both singers' fourth chart-topping single in the US, as well as Summer's final) and number one for four weeks on the disco chart. "No More Tears" was also a big international hit, and made the top three in both Canada and the UK.

The song’s original title was simply “Enough is Enough,” which didn’t fit the theme of Streisand’s Wet album, in which every song had something to do with water. So the songwriters changed the title and added the introduction: “It’s raining, it’s pouring, my love life is boring me to tears.”

After recording "No More Tears" Summer and Streisand did not perform the song together live, although Summer did sing the song in concert with other female performers, including Tina Arena and her sister Mary Gaines Bernard. Streisand included the song as part of her 2012 Barbra Live concert tour (released as Back to Brooklyn), where she discussed Summer's recent passing and how she wished Donna were alive to sing the song together.

A later remix released as "Enough Is Enough 2017" climbed to #3 on the US Dance Club chart.

Personnel
Vocals: Barbra Streisand and Donna Summer
Acoustic and Electric Piano: Greg Mathieson
Bass: Neil Stubenhaus
Drums: James Gadson
Guitar: Jay Graydon and Jeff Baxter
Background Vocals: Julia Waters, Maxine Waters, Luther Waters
Produced By Gary Klein for The Entertainment Company in association with Giorgio Moroder Productions
Arranged and Conducted by Greg Mathieson
Vocals arranged by Bruce Roberts, Paul Jabara and Luther Waters
Engineered by Juergen Koppers and John Arrias
Recorded at Village Recorders and Rusk Sound Studios, Los Angeles

Charts

Weekly charts

Year-end charts

Certifications and sales

Parodies
Comedian Eddie Murphy recorded a parody version of the song as it might be performed by exercise guru Richard Simmons and Our Gang actor Billie "Buckwheat" Thomas. The song appears on Murphy's 1982 self-titled comedy album.

On the UPN’s series “Half & Half,” the song was performed in an episode by Phyllis (Telma Hopkins) and Big Dee Dee (Valarie Pettitord).

Sampling
 In 2008, Serbian pop-folk singer Jelena Karleuša used the 'enough is enough' line on her album JK Revolution. It can be heard in the song "Mala (TeatroMix)".
An interpretation of "No More Tears" begins "Rainy Dayz" by Raekwon and Ghostface Killah.

Kym Mazelle & Jocelyn Brown version

In 1994, American singers Kym Mazelle and Jocelyn Brown released a cover of the song. It was produced by Mike Stock and Matt Aitken. The single peaked at number 13 in its second week at the UK Singles Chart, on June 12. It also charted in Australia, Belgium and Ireland, where it reached number 19. The single marked the first collaboration between producers Mike Stock and Matt Aitken since the split of the famous '80s production triumvirate with Pete Waterman. The idea to record the Streisand/Summer song came from the head of the Bell label Simon Cowell. Stock told in a 1994 interview, "The idea was to make something more camp and outrageous than k.d. lang and Andy Bell's recent version, which we found a bit drippy."

Critical reception
Larry Flick from Billboard commented, "All we have to say is that we would have paid any price to have witnessed the recording session for the Kym Mazelle/Jocelyn Brown duet "No More Tears." No doubt it was the diva fest to end them all—not to mention true history in the making. Only a pair with the vocal seasoning of these dance music legends could take on the Barbra Streisand/Donna Summer classic and make it work so well. The original version of the track was produced with a giddy hi-NRG attitude by Stock & Aitken". Robbert Tilli from Music & Media stated, "This remake is likely to be as big as a gay anthem as its forerunner was." Alan Jones from Music Week gave it four out of five, adding that when "these two mighty big mouths join together for a revamp" of the Streisand/Summer hit, "it will, of course, be a big hit." James Hamilton from the magazine's RM Dance Update deemed it a "Hi-NRG tempoed but cheesy" track.

Music video
A music video was made to accompany the song, directed by Max Giwa & Dani Pasquini, known as just Max & Dani. It was released on May 30 and features camp theatrics that collide in a beauty salon.

Track listing
 CD single, UK (1994)
"No More Tears (Enough Is Enough)" (Radio Edit) (Short Intro) – 4:56
"No More Tears (Enough Is Enough)" (Radio Edit) (Full Intro) – 5:56
"No More Tears (Enough Is Enough)" (Classic Disco Mix By Evolution) – 7:39
"One More Time" – 4:14

Charts

References

External links
 

1979 singles
1994 singles
Barbra Streisand songs
Donna Summer songs
Amber (singer) songs
Jocelyn Brown songs
Billboard Hot 100 number-one singles
Cashbox number-one singles
Number-one singles in Sweden
Hi-NRG songs
Disco songs
Eurodance songs
Songs with feminist themes
Songs written by Bruce Roberts (singer)
Songs written by Paul Jabara
Female vocal duets
Arista Records singles
Casablanca Records singles
Columbia Records singles
Song recordings produced by Giorgio Moroder
1979 songs
Song recordings produced by Gary Klein (producer)